
Year 451 BC was a year of the pre-Julian Roman calendar. At the time, it was known as the Year of the Consulship of Sabinus and Augurinus and the First year of the decemviri (or, less frequently, year 303 Ab urbe condita). The denomination 451 BC for this year has been used since the early medieval period, when the Anno Domini calendar era became the prevalent method in Europe, for naming years.

Events 
 By place 
 Greece 
 The Persian fleet moves against a rebellious Cyprus to restore order. Kimon, who returns to favour, though not to power, in Athens, plans an expedition to help Cyprus. He gains Pericles' support.
 An Athenian law sponsored by Pericles is passed giving citizenship only to those born of Athenian parents. This marks an end to the policy where residents who were from other cities could be given an honourable status.
 Hostilities among the Greek states come to a formal end with the agreement to the Five Years' Truce. Kimon negotiates a five year truce with Sparta, in which Athens agrees to abandon its alliance with Argos, while Sparta promises to give up its alliance with Thebes. During the same year Argos signs the first "Thirty-Years Peace" with Sparta.

 Roman Republic 
 Following the report of a three-man commission into the design of Roman law, the patricians set up in Rome a Board of Ten, the Decemviri. The first Decemviri, composed entirely of patricians is led by consuls Appius Claudius Crassus and Titus Genucius Augurinus. The first ten codes of the Roman Law of the Twelve Tables are completed by the first Decemvirate.

Births

Deaths

References